Üçağaç is a village in the Silopi district of Şırnak Province in Turkey. The village is populated by Kurds of the Tayan tribe and had a population of 822 in 2021.

The hamlets of Poyraz, Şemalbeg and Taşlıca are attached to Pınarönü.

References 

Villages in Silopi District
Kurdish settlements in Şırnak Province